The Rio de Janeiro gubernatorial election was held on October 3, 2010 to elect the next governor of Rio de Janeiro. With high approval ratings, the PMDB's Sérgio Cabral Filho was easily re-elected without the need for a runoff.

Candidates

Governor

Election results

References 

October 2010 events in South America
Rio de Janeiro gubernatorial elections
2010 Brazilian gubernatorial elections